The East Asian rainy season, also called the plum rain, is caused by precipitation along a persistent stationary front known as the Meiyu front for nearly two months during the late spring and early summer in East Asia between mainland China, Taiwan, Korea, Japan, Northern Vietnam, the Philippines, and the Russian Far East. The wet season ends during the summer when the subtropical ridge becomes strong enough to push this front north of the region. These weather systems can produce heavy rainfall and flooding.

Etymology
In China, the term "plum rain" was used for the rain in the fourth and fifth lunar month. It specifically refers to the historical belief that, when the plums turn yellow and fall at the south of the Yangtze in the fourth and fifth months, the moisture that evaporates from the plant turns into rain.

The term appears in the following poem by Du Fu (fl. 8th century) of the Tang dynasty:

Japan later adapted and transliterated the Chinese term "plum rain" to call the rainy season .

The season is instead commonly called Jangma (장마) in Korea, which means "long rain". The term was originally spelled Dyangmah (댱마ㅎ) in 1500s, which was the mix of the hanja character 長 ("long") and the old native Korean word 마ㅎ (mah, "rain"). The word Dyangmah eventually transformed from Jyangma (쟝마) in 1700s to the current form of Jangma after 1900s.

Formation
An east-west zone of disturbed weather during spring along this front stretches from the east China coast, initially across Taiwan and Okinawa, later, when it has shifted to the north, eastward into the southern peninsula of South Korea and Japan. The rainy season usually lasts from May to June in Taiwan and Okinawa, from June to July (approximately 50 days) in Russian Primorsky Krai, Japan and Korea and from July to August in eastern China (especially the Yangtze and Huai River regions).

The weather front forms when the moist air over the Pacific meets the cooler continental air mass. The front and the formation of frontal depressions along it brings precipitation to Primorsky Krai, Japan, Korea, eastern China, and Taiwan. As the front moves back and forth depending on the strength of cool and warm air masses, there is often prolonged precipitation and sometimes flooding in eastern China. However, in the years that it does not rain as much as usual, a drought might result. The rainy season ends when the warm air mass associated with the subtropical ridge is strong enough to push the front north and away.

Effects
The high humidity in the air during this season encourages the formation of mold and rot not only on food but on fabrics as well.
Environmentally, heavy rains encourage mudslides and flooding in all areas affected.

Japan
In Japan, the rainy season is called , and lasts from early June to mid-July in most of the country (Honshu, Kyushu and Shikoku), approximately June 7 to July 20 in the Kansai and Kantō regions in Honshū. The  season is roughly a month earlier (early May through mid-June) in Okinawa (the southernmost region of the country). The pop artist Eiichi Ohtaki produced a popular song by this name, and a WW2 Japanese naval ship was also given this name.

This period is generally avoided for tourism, but some sights are considered particularly atmospheric in the rain and fog, particularly mountain forests, notably Sacred Sites and Pilgrimage Routes in the Kii Mountain Range (including Mount Kōya). Vegetation, especially moss, is also rather lush at this time, and hence sights known for their moss, such as Saihō-ji (the moss temple) are also popular at this time of year.

Korea
The rainy season is between June and mid-July. It is caused by hot and humid high pressure forming in the Sea of Okhotsk due to the North Pacific anticyclone combining with Asiatic continental high pressure. When the two meteorological events meet they form a long  (from 장마 "rainy season" and 전선 [前線] "weather front"). Beginning in late-May, the North Pacific high pressure forces the weaker continental anticyclone south of Okinawa Island. This fall to the south then reverses and gradually strengthens as it moves northwards back towards the Korean peninsula. On landfall, heavy monsoon rains lead to torrential downpours and flooding. By August the system has weakened as the southern systems retreat towards the Philippine archipelago.

By early autumn, the North Pacific high-pressure system is pushed away as Asiatic continental cold high pressure moves southwards. This produces inclement weather although not on the scale of the summer monsoons. Korea can, however, be struck by typhoons during this period.

Timing 
In some years, the rainy season's actual beginning and end are under debate. For example, in 2005, the subtropical ridge moved quickly northward in late June/early July. The weather front skipped the Yangtze region and there was no rainy season there. Then, the ridge retreated southward and there was significant rainfall in the region. This gave rise to the question of whether this was the summer-type rainfall pattern that is common after the first rainy season or the second rainy season. Some meteorologists even argued that the rainy period in late June was not a true rainy season.

See also 
 East Asian Monsoon
Meiyu front
 List of China-related topics
 List of Japan-related topics
 List of Taiwan related topics

References

Environment of East Asia
Climate of China
Climate of Taiwan
Climate of North Korea
Climate of South Korea
Climate of Japan
Precipitation
Rain
Summer
Tropical meteorology
Kigo